Ebbsfleet International railway station  is in Ebbsfleet Valley, Kent,  east of London, England, near Dartford and the Bluewater shopping centre to the west and Gravesend to the east. It served as a primary park-and-rail service for the London 2012 Olympics.

Ebbsfleet International is owned by HS1 Ltd, which operates the High Speed 1 railway and St Pancras railway station, Stratford International, Ebbsfleet International and Ashford International.

Name
The name Ebbsfleet dates from the seventeenth-century. The station is partly inspired by the name of Ebbsfleet in Thanet,  to the east.

History

Opening
The £180m station opened to Eurostar passengers on 19 November 2007, five days after the rest of HS1. The first daily service was the 05:38 service to Paris, arriving at its destination 132 minutes later. Serving the Thames Gateway, the station had an initial service of seven weekday trains to Paris and five to Brussels. A 2,500-space car park was provided.

A formal opening ceremony in the presence of Dame Kelly Holmes took place on 29 January 2008. 

Naming
"Ebbsfleet International Station" was the name originally proposed for the station, but "Dartford International Station" was later proposed at the urging of Eurostar, who felt that Dartford was a name with greater national recognition. Opposition to Eurostar's ‘Dartford International’ proposal came from Gravesham Borough Council, whose administrative centre at Gravesend is just two miles away (even though Ebbsfleet International is in the borough of Dartford and therefore outside Gravesham council's authority); Southfleet Parish Council; and Swanscombe and Greenhithe Town Council, both in the Borough of Dartford.

Javelin
The Olympic Javelin or Javelin was a high-speed train shuttle service operated by Southeastern over High Speed 1 during the 2012 Summer Olympics and Paralympics. The service ran for the duration of both games, between St Pancras International station and this station, via Stratford International station, which is close to the Olympic Park. During the Summer Olympics a service of eight trains an hour ran between St Pancras and Ebbsfleet, calling at Stratford, replacing the usual East Kent highspeed service. Two of these were extended to Ashford and one to Faversham. Between 11pm and 1am the service between St Pancras and Ebbsfleet was increased to twelve per hour.

Eurostar suspension (2020-)
In September 2020, Eurostar announced that due to the ongoing COVID-19 pandemic and subsequent collapse in ticket revenue (down by 90%), both Ebbsfleet and Ashford International stations would not be served by Eurostar services until at least 2022.
In September 2021, Eurostar confirmed that services would not resume until 2023, despite complaints by local politicians that this was "bad for Kent". Eurostar stated that they will resume services when commercially sensible to do so, as they will initially "focus on destinations where demand is highest". A further update in August 2022 confirmed that Eurostar may not resume serving the station (along with Ashford) until at least 2025.

Layout
On High Speed 1 there are avoiding lines in each direction and four platforms, two serving international Eurostar services and two the Southeastern High-speed services. Southeastern services travelling between London and the North Kent Line use a junction to the north of the station and are served by another pair of platforms that curve away to the east.

Ticket barriers control access to all platforms.

A disused bridge can be seen to the south of the station. This is believed to have been put in place in preparation for the Ebbsfleet Garden City housing development, however, was never needed.

Access and facilities
This station has bilingual signage, both in French and English. It is one of the relatively few stations in England to have bilingual signage, others being Wallsend (Latin), Southall (Punjabi), Hereford (Welsh),  Whitechapel (Bengali), St Pancras and Ashford International (French).

Parking
The Channel Tunnel Rail Link (CTRL) Act allows a total of 9,000 car parking spaces to be constructed, with an initial 6,000 built. The car parks are in a number of areas around the station - north of the North Kent Line, between the North Kent Line and High Speed 1, south of the High Speed 1 and south west of the station building.

Buses and coaches
The station is served by Fastrack buses operated by Arriva Southern Counties, which connect it to Dartford, Bluewater, Greenhithe, Swanscombe and Gravesend. Despite being in close proximity to the station, Northfleet has no bus connection to the station.

Taxis
There is a taxi rank directly outside the station entrance/exit. Car rental services for both leisure and business are located in the concourse. The interchange facilities lie at either end of the main station box - taxis, buses and set down at the northern end (to also serve the NKL platforms) and coaches to the south of the station box.
It was formerly planned that Crossrail would terminate at a separate station between Northfleet and Ebbsfleet International but under the current plan, Abbey Wood further west will be the eastern terminus. However, a Crossrail extension from Abbey Wood to Gravesend (Hoo Junction) remains safeguarded.

Pedestrian access
Northfleet railway station is approximately 400 metres to the north-east, although the walking distance between the two stations is significantly longer, approximately 2 km if roadside footpaths are followed. There is a shorter walking route (approximately 1,000 metres) through the car park to the north of Ebbsfleet station, but there are no footpaths provided and this way is obstructed by the car park access barriers. There are no specific pedestrian or cycle route signs for Ebbsfleet station on any of the possible routes between the stations. Gravesham Council acknowledges that the existing provision is inadequate, although it is a complex planning issue to resolve as whilst Northfleet is in Gravesham, Ebbsfleet station is just over the border in the Borough of Dartford, and there are many other stakeholders involved.

Services

Domestic Services

Service History
On 7 September the service was enhanced by a few services to Ramsgate via  or Dover. A regular service began on 13 December 2009.

The typical off-peak service in trains per hour was:

 4 tph to London St Pancras International
 2 tph to 
 1 tph to  via 
 1 tph to 

Current Services
All domestic services at Ebbsfleet International are operated by Southeastern using  EMUs.

The typical off-peak service in trains per hour is:
 3 tph to London St Pancras International
 1 tph to  via  and 
 1 tph to Ramsgate via 
 1 tph to  via 

Additional services call at the station during the peak hours.

International Services

Since the opening of Ebbsfleet station in 2007, Eurostar has transferred a number of trips from Ashford to the newer station. Ashford International has a wider variety of destinations such as Calais, Lille, Brussels, Disneyland Paris, the French Alps, Paris, Lyon, Avignon and Marseille, but with fewer services to them. In contrast, Ebbsfleet International has services to only the core destinations (Paris, Brussels and Lille) and the Disneyland Paris service, but with much more frequent services.

It is not permitted to use Eurostar services for domestic journeys in the UK. Since the station's opening, Eurostar has withheld passenger usage statistics for international services, citing commercial confidentiality.

As of May 2019, the typical Eurostar services was:

 6 trains per day to Paris Gare du Nord
 6 trains per day to Brussels-South, via Lille Europe (some via Ashford International additionally)
 4 trains per week to Marne-la-Vallee - Chessy for Disneyland Paris via Ashford International and Lille Europe.

Eurostar services have been suspended since March 31st 2020.

Gallery

Notes

References

External links

 Ebbsfleet International station
 Always touch out project details
 BBC picture gallery
 Kent Rail page on the station and related works on CTRL phase 2
 Ebbsfleet Gateway
 HS1 Javelin Trains

Railway stations in Kent
Transport in the Borough of Dartford
DfT Category B stations
Railway stations opened by Network Rail
Railway stations in Great Britain opened in 2007
Railway stations served by Southeastern
Railway stations in Great Britain served by Eurostar
UK railway stations with juxtaposed controls